Kalamb is a town in Raigad district in the Indian state of Maharashtra.
Kalamb Gram Panchayat, Karjat, Raigad, Village  of a Karjat Taluka, Raigad district which is well connected to Panvel, Mumbai, Thane and Pune, Karjat, Neral, India Kalamb  along with Karjat is also known as Eastern Mumbai District.

Government 
Kalamb is a town in Raigad district in the Indian state of Maharashtra. Kalamb Gram Panchayat, Karjat, Raigad, Village of a Karjat Taluka, Raigad district

 
kalamb Gram Panchayat This is the Part of  Panchayat Samiti Karjat Raigad , Karjat in 
Raigad Zilla Parishad Alibag
Raigad district, Maharashtra.

List of all currently a member of panchayat

 Sarpanch 
Mr. Pramod Tukaram Kondilkar  (SKP) = Gram Vikas Aghadi 
 Deputy Sarpanch And Member 3 - 1 
Mr. Parkash Kaluram Nirguda (INC) B 
1 - 1 Member
Mr. Prasad Eknath Bade (BSS)
1 - 2 Member
Mrs. Ranjana Nilesh Wagh (INC) B 
2 - 1 Member
Mr. Omprakash Shivram Bade (BSS)
2 - 2 Member
Mrs. Nirmala Ganesh Nirguda (SKP)
2 - 3 Member
Mrs. Reshma Ramesh Bade (SHS(UBT)) B
3 - 2 Member
Mr. Santosh Vasant Modak (SKP)
3 - 3 Member
Mrs. Taibai Palu Pardhi (SKP)
4 - 1 Member
Mr. Ambo Kashinath Pardhi (INC) A
4 - 2 Member
Mrs. Sugandha Shankar Mali (SHS(UBT)) B
4 - 3 Member
Mrs. Kanija Nisar Logde (INC) A
5 - 1 Member
Mr. Shahid Sikandar Maste (NCP)
5 - 2 Member
Mrs. Revta Lahu Dhole (SKP)

Officer 
Head Officer of Village Kalamb

List of Sarpanch
Mr. Namdev Pandurang Bade
Mr. Ajid Logde
Mr. Namdev Pandurang Bade
Mr. Krishna Pandharintha Bade  
Mr. Dharma Nirguda 
Mrs. Revta Lahu Dhole
(2007 - 2012)
Mr. Pramod Tukaram Kondilkar
(2012 - 2015)
Mr. Faik Ahmed Khan
(2015 - 2017)
Mrs. Madhuri Moreshwar Bade
(2017 - 17 December 2022)
Mr. Pramod Tukaram Kondilkar (SKP)
(20 December 2022 - Incumbent)

List of Deputy Sarpanch
Mr. Namdev jitu Bade
(2012 - 2007)
Mrs. Smita Jeevan Modak
(2012 - 2017)
Mr. Rahul Shankarsingh Pardesi
(2017 - 17 December 2022)
Mr. Parkash Kaluram Nirguda (INC)  
(02 January 2023 - Incumbent)

List of  Leader of the Opposition
Mr Ashok devlikar
(2017 - 2019)
Mrs. Rekha Sagar Bade
(2019 - 2022)
Mr. Shahid Sikandar Maste (NCP)
(02 January 2023 - Incumbent)

List of Village Development Officer
Mr. Ganesh Bahde
(2018 - 2021)
Mrs. S. P. Babanle	 
(2021 - 04 October 2022)
Mr. Dhanaji Burud
(04 October 2022 - Incumbent)

2017 Kalamb Sarpanch and Member Gram Panchayat Election
 
Executive branch
(2017 - 2022)

 Sarpanch 
Mrs. Madhuri Morehwar bade
 Deputy Sarpanch and 4 - 2 Member 
Mr. Rahul Shankarsingh Pardesi
1 - 1 Member 
Mr. Kishor kishan Dhule  
1 - 2 Member 
Mr. Naresh Krishna Bade
1 - 3 Member 
Mrs. Geeta Jagannay Shelke
2 - 1 Member 
Mr. Ashok Govind Devilkar
2 - 2 Member 
Mrs. Jayanti Deepak Mirkute
2 - 3 Member 
Mrs. Shamin Manzoor Logde  
3 - 1 Member 
Mr. Parkash Kaluram Nirguda 
3 - 2 Member 
Mrs. Neelam Vasant Dhole  
3 - 3 Member 
Mrs. Janaki Kamlu  Pardhi 
4 - 2 Member  
Mrs. Mina Shankar Nirguda 
5 - 1 Member 
Mr. Rupesh Dashrath Wadh 
5 - 2 Member 
Mrs. Rekha Sagar Bade

2022 Kalamb Sarpanch and Member Gram Panchayat Election
 

Executive branch
(20 December 2022 - Incumbent)

 Sarpanch 
Mr. Pramod Tukaram Kondilkar  (SKP) = Gram Vikas Aghadi 
 Deputy Sarpanch And Member 3 - 1 
Mr. Parkash Kaluram Nirguda (INC) B 
1 - 1 Member
Mr. Prasad Eknath Bade (BSS)
1 - 2 Member
Mrs. Ranjana Nilesh Wagh (INC) B 
2 - 1 Member
Mr. Omprakash Shivram Bade (BSS)
2 - 2 Member
Mrs. Nirmala Ganesh Nirguda (SKP)
2 - 3 Member
Mrs. Reshma Ramesh Bade (SHS(UBT)) B
3 - 2 Member
Mr. Santosh Vasant Modak (SKP)
3 - 3 Member
Mrs. Taibai Palu Pardhi (SKP)
4 - 1 Member
Mr. Ambo Kashinath Pardhi (INC) A
4 - 2 Member
Mrs. Sugandha Shankar Mali (SHS(UBT)) B
4 - 3 Member
Mrs. Kanija Nisar Logde (INC) A
5 - 1 Member
Mr. Shahid Sikandar Maste (NCP)
5 - 2 Member
Mrs. Revta Lahu Dhole (SKP)

Languages 
Marathi
Aagri
Urdu
Hindi
kokni
Aadivasi

Education Facilities
 Raigad Zilla Parishad Urdu School kalamb
 Raigad Zilla Parishad Marathi   School Kalamb
 Koaeso Pragati Madaymick Vidyalay kalamb
Ashramshala Kalamb

Geography
Kalamb is located in the taluka of Karjat in Raigad district in the state of Maharashtra. It is 21 km north-east from the main Town Karjat, 12 km from Neral, 79.7 km from its District Main City Raigad and 82 km from its state capital Mumbai. It falls on the road connecting Karjat and Murbad.

The village occupies 764 hectares.

Hospitals in Kalamb
Primary Health Center Kalamb
Kalamb Karjat - Murbad Rd; Maharashtra 410101, India

Hindu Temples in Kalamb
Kalamb Dahivalikar Maharaj Math
Kalamb Maharashtra 410101 India

JAY TADOBA TEMPLE
Kalamb Maharashtra 410101  India
Hanuman Mandir
Kalamb Maharashtra 410101 India

Islamic Temples in Kalamb
Hazrat Amin Shah Baba Dargah
At Pos.  Kalamb Tat.  karjat Dist.  Raigad Maharashtra 410101  India
Hazrat Sheikh Ali Shah Baba Dargah
At Pos.  Kalamb Tal.  karjat Dist.  Raigad Maharashtra 410101  India
Hazrat Kutub Shamsuddin Rahmatullahlaih Shah Baba Dargah
At Pos.  Kalamb Tal.  karjat Dist.  Raigad Maharashtra 410101  India
Sanni Jama Masjid Kalamb
At Pos.  Kalamb Tal .  karjat Dist.  Raigad Maharashtra 410101  India
Cities and towns in Raigad district